Ronaldo Luiz Alves (born 9 July 1989), known as Ronaldo Alves, is a Brazilian footballer who plays as a centre-back for Ferroviária.

Club
Internacional
Copa FGF: 2010
Taça Farroupilha: 2011, 2013
Campeonato Gaucho: 2011, 2013
Taça Piratini: 2013

Náutico
Copa Pernambuco: 2011
Campeonato Pernambucano: 2021

References

External links
Ronaldo Alves at playmakerstats.com (English version of ogol.com.br)

1989 births
Living people
People from Bebedouro
Brazilian footballers
Association football defenders
Campeonato Brasileiro Série A players
Campeonato Brasileiro Série B players
Club Athletico Paranaense players
Sport Club Internacional players
Clube Náutico Capibaribe players
Criciúma Esporte Clube players
Avaí FC players
Sport Club do Recife players
Guarani FC players
Footballers from São Paulo (state)
Associação Ferroviária de Esportes players